This is a list of juices. Juice is a liquid that is naturally contained in fruit and vegetables. It can also refer to liquids that are flavored with these or other biological food sources such as meat and seafood. It is commonly consumed as a beverage or used as an ingredient or flavoring in foods.

Juices

See also

 Fruit and vegetable beer
 Health shake
 Juice bar
 Mexican juice bar (frutería)
 Juicer
 Juicing
 List of fruit dishes
 List of lemonade topics
 List of lemon dishes and beverages
 List of vegetable dishes

References

Lists of drinks